Yocalla Municipality is the second municipal section of the Tomás Frías Province in the Potosí Department in Bolivia. Its seat is Yocalla.

Geography 
Some of the highest mountains of the municipality are listed below:

Subdivision 
The municipality consists of the following cantons: 
 Salinas de Yocalla
 Santa Lucia
 Yocalla

The people 
The people are predominantly indigenous citizens of Quechua descent.

See also 
 Pillku Mayu

References

External links 
Yocalla Municipality: population data and map

Municipalities of Potosí Department